Wycombe is a defunct station on the Reading Company's New Hope Branch. The station is currently on the line used by the New Hope Railroad.

History
Service to the Wycombe station started 1891 and ended 1952. The station was restored in 2009 by the county, as it was sold off in the 1990s. The railroad leases the station during private events such as photo charters, or when passenger service requires its use. For example, the station sees use during the railroad's "Fall Foliage" trains. Passenger trains usually don't go south of Wycombe, as everything south between Wycombe and Warminster is freight only. Originally, the station was called "Lingohocken".

References

Former Reading Company stations
Former railway stations in Bucks County, Pennsylvania
Frank Furness buildings
Railway stations in the United States opened in 1891
Railway stations closed in 1952